St. James High School is a senior high school and middle school in Vacherie, Louisiana in St. James Parish. It is a part of the St. James Parish School Board and serves grades 7–12.

Athletics
St. James High athletics competes in the LHSAA.

There are a variety of sports that are available to students, including boys' basketball, girls' basketball, baseball, softball, track and field, bowling, football, volleyball, and swimming.

State Championships
(5) Football: 1959, 1960, 1966, 1979, 2019

Notable alumni
John Folse, chef, television/radio host and author
Cory Geason, NFL tight end
Corey Webster, NFL defensive back
Rydell Melancon, NFL linebacker

References

External links
 St. James High School website

Public high schools in Louisiana
Schools in St. James Parish, Louisiana